Crednal is a historic home located near Unison, Loudoun County, Virginia, United States. The building is an example of an early-19th-century, Federal-style, two-story, five bay, brick dwelling built in 1814, that was constructed around an existing 18th-century, vernacular, residential stone core. A two-story, three-bay frame wing was constructed in 1870.  In 1993, a two-story, two-bay, Greek Revival-style brick dwelling that had been slated for demolition from Greene County, Virginia, was moved to the property and attached to the house by a hyphen.  Also on the property are the contributing Carter family cemetery and an unmarked slave cemetery.

It was listed on the National Register of Historic Places in 2011.

References

Houses on the National Register of Historic Places in Virginia
Federal architecture in Virginia
Greek Revival houses in Virginia
Houses completed in 1785
Houses in Loudoun County, Virginia
National Register of Historic Places in Loudoun County, Virginia